Never Forget is an album by punk rock band Alien Father.

Track listing
"The Final Frontier"  – 1:26
"Alan Cummings Twice"  – 3:57
"Octopus vs Paddel"  – 1:01
"Never Forget: Taylor Halsey"  – 0:59
"Windsock Superfuck"  – 1:04
"Orange You Glad?"  – 1:56
"D"  – 1:35
"Candy Is Dandy (If Yr A Teen)"  – 1:04
"fgt lawbuster"  – 2:30
"Myopian Desert"  – 1:56

Album personnel
Dave Hallinger – guitar and vocals
Curtis Regian – bass guitar and synth
Mike Topley – drums

Cover art
The cover of Never Forget is a photograph by Abraham Zapruder of the John F. Kennedy assassination.

External links 
 Sons of Brothas

2007 albums
Alien Father albums